Raquel Atawo and Abigail Spears were the defending champions but chose not to participate this year.
Andrea Hlaváčková and Peng Shuai won the title, defeating Gabriela Dabrowski and Yang Zhaoxuan in the final, 7–5, 3–6, [10–7].

Seeds

Draw

References 
 Main draw

Nottingham Open - Doubles
Nottingham Open